"17" is a song by MK featuring uncredited vocals by Carla Monroe, released as a single on September 1, 2017. It peaked at number seven in the UK, making it MK's highest charting single there. The song has been included on various music compilations such as The Annual 2018 and Now 98

Music video
An official lyric video was uploaded on YouTube to MK's Vevo channel on September 1, 2017. The official music video was released to the same place two months later on November 6, 2017. As of February 2, 2022, the video has over 46,300,000 views. This video was also uploaded on Ultra Music's YouTube channel, and as of the same date, has more than 2,200,000 views.

Track listing

Charts

Weekly charts

Year-end charts

Certifications

Release history

References

External links

2017 songs
2017 singles
MK (DJ) songs
Songs written by Marc Kinchen
Songs written by Mike Di Scala